Nathan Sherlock (born 2 February 1990) is a former Australian soccer player.

Career
Having plied his trade in the NSW State leagues with the likes of Sydney Olympic and West Sydney Berries Sherlock has also spent time with the Central Coast Mariners however failed to make a senior appearance, despite making several match day squads and their Asian Champions League list.

Sydney FC
On 18 May 2011 he signed a professional contract A-League club Sydney FC. Sherlock was called up to the senior Sydney FC squad for their 2011 Asian Champions League campaign, however did not feature in any matches, despite traveling with the team to Japan for a game. He made his debut for the club during the community round of the 2011-12 A-League season during their 1-1 draw with Perth Glory at Campbelltown Stadium. However, as a result of Sydney FC failing to qualify for the A-League finals, Sherlock, along with teammates Paul Reid, Krunoslav Lovrek, Trent McClenahan, Adam Griffiths and Jarrod Kyle were released by Sydney FC at the conclusion of the 2012-13 A-League season.

He subsequently joined Sydney United in the NSW Premier League where he won the championship under Mark Rudan in 2013.

Honours
With Sydney United:
  Waratah Cup: 2015, 2016

References

External links
 Sydney FC profile

1990 births
Living people
Australian soccer players
A-League Men players
Central Coast Mariners FC players
Sydney FC players
Sydney United 58 FC players
Association football defenders